Tascina dalattensis is a moth in the Castniidae family. It is found in southern Vietnam.

Fukuda describes T. dalattensis as being "most similar to T. nicevillei, T. metallica", species which are found in Vietnam, Myanmar (Tenasserim) and the Philippines (Palawan island).

References

Moths described in 2000
Castniidae